Russel S. "Russ" Witherby (born February 3, 1962 in Cincinnati, Ohio) is an American coach and former competitive figure skater. He competed in ice dance with several partners. He and April Sargent Thomas competed in the 1992 Winter Olympics. His other partners included Lois Luciani and Susie Wynne.

He is currently coaching at the Philadelphia Skating Club and Humane Society in Philadelphia, Pennsylvania.

Results

With Luciani

With Sargent

With Wynne

References

American male ice dancers
Olympic figure skaters of the United States
Figure skaters at the 1992 Winter Olympics
1962 births
Living people
Competitors at the 1990 Goodwill Games